She Wouldn't Say Yes is a 1945 screwball comedy film directed by Alexander Hall and starring Rosalind Russell and Lee Bowman.

Plot
A psychiatrist, Dr. Susan Lane, is leaving a military hospital after spending two weeks working with patients there. Before she leaves, she encounters a patient reading a comic strip by Michael Kent. The comic's character, the Nixie, encourages people to act on their impulses by whistling in their ear. Dr. Lane explains to the patient that it's not good to act on their impulses. Colonel Brady, another psychiatrist, mentions to Dr. Lane that her confidence as a professional comes from some problem that she has repressed.

Later, at Grand Central Station, Dr. Lane picks up her train ticket and gets knocked down by another customer who apologizes. Several bumps and bruises later, she leaves and the customer—who turns out to be comic writer Michael Kent—picks up his ticket. At the last minute, the clerk—acting on his impulse because of the Nixie—switches Kent's ticket to be the same compartment as Dr. Lane's ticket.

On the train, Kent and Dr. Lane bump into each other again while at the bar. He continues to get on her nerves as the days pass. One day, he tricks her into marrying him.

Cast 

Rosalind Russell was cast in the part of Dr. Susan Lane, an unmarried psychiatrist, happy to be single. Russell had a prolific film career with Metro-Goldwyn-Mayer starting in 1934, when she signed a seven-year contract with them. She had been nominated for an Academy Award three years earlier as Best Actress in a Leading Role for her part in My Sister Eileen.

Lee Bowman played the part of Michael Kent, a cartoonist in the military that pens a comic strip, The Nixie, which encourages people to follow their impulses.

Rosalind Russell as Dr. Susan A. Lane
Lee Bowman as Michael Kent
Adele Jergens as Allura
Charles Winninger as Doctor Lane
Harry Davenport as Albert
Sara Haden as Laura Pitts
Percy Kilbride as Judge Whittaker
Lewis L. Russell as Colonel Brady
Arthur Q. Bryan as Train Passenger in sleeping car (speaking in Elmer Fudd voice)
Mary Treen as Train Passenger at Bar
Carl Switzer (uncredited) as the flower delivery boy
Ray Walker as Docter

Production 
The original working title for the film was Some Call It Love and was later changed to She Wouldn't Say Yes. Production for the film began on May 8, 1945 and went through July 14. 1945. Rosalind Russell had previously worked with director Alexander Hall on several films including My Sister Eileen from 1942 and This Thing Called Love from 1940.

The release date of the film caused an anachronism in the plot: the traveling Kent character is en route to Japan, via San Francisco, and mentions at least three times he is "off to war"—but the war ended three months earlier.

Release 
She Wouldn't Say Yes was released to theatres on November 29, 1945. The film was adapted as a radio play for Screen Directors Playhouse and broadcast on June 2, 1950. The radio play was released as an audiobook on cassette in 1977.

Home media 
She Wouldn't Say Yes was first released to the home video market on video cassette. The movie was released to DVD on August 4, 2009 as part of the Icons of Screwball Comedy, Volume 1 set along with 
If You Could Only Cook, Too Many Husbands, and My Sister Eileen.

Reception

References

Bibliography

External links 
 
 
 

Films directed by Alexander Hall
Columbia Pictures films
American black-and-white films
American romantic comedy films
1945 romantic comedy films
1945 films
1940s American films